This is a list of town tramway systems in Greece. It includes all tram systems in Greece, past and present; cities with currently operating systems, and those systems themselves, are indicated in bold and blue background colored rows.  Those tram systems that operated on other than standard gauge track (where known) are indicated in the 'Notes' column.

See also
 List of town tramway systems – parent article
 List of town tramway systems in Europe
 List of tram and light rail transit systems
 List of metro systems

References
 Books, Periodicals and External Links

Specific

 
Tram
Greece